Aquilon was a  74-gun ship of the line of the French Navy.

She was captured and recommissioned in the Royal Navy as HMS Aboukir.

See also
 List of ships of the line of France

References

External links
 

Ships of the line of the French Navy
Téméraire-class ships of the line
1789 ships